Otley is a small unincorporated community in Marion County, Iowa, United States.  Governed by state laws and county ordinances.  It is located approximately 45 miles southeast of the capital, Des Moines, on Iowa Highway 163.  The US Post Office has a ZIP Code of 50214. Otley has one post office and is home to Vyke Industries, Mills Mid-Iowa Machinery, LLC, Otley Reformed Church, and Two Rivers Co-op. Additionally, home of several people who went on to form O.P.S. Social Club.

References

Unincorporated communities in Marion County, Iowa
Unincorporated communities in Iowa